Theatre Square or Teatralnaya Square (Teatralnaya ploshchad), known as Sverdlov Square between 1919 and 1991, is a city square in the Tverskoy District of central Moscow, Russia. It is at the junction of Kuznetsky Bridge Street, Petrovka Street, and Theatre Drive (north-west of the latter; the square south-east of Theatre Drive is the separate Revolution Square).

The square is named after the three theatres located on it: the Bolshoi Theatre, Maly Theatre, and Russian Academic Youth Theatre. 

The square is served by the Moscow metro at the Teatralnaya station on the Zamoskvoretskaya Line; Okhotny Ryad station on the Sokolnicheskaya Line; and Ploshchad Revolyutsii station on the Arbatsko-Pokrovskaya Line.

History

The square emerged after the 1812 Fire of Moscow and conversion of the Neglinnaya River into an underground channel. The river still flows diagonally under the square's park. It was designed in a symmetrical Neoclassical style by Joseph Bove in the 1820s, with Neoclassical Style buildings framing it. However, in the second half of the 19th century the Neoclassical ensemble was destroyed by new buildings in eclectic styles, that were considerably taller than the original ones fronting the square. The square also has the Gothic Revival style TsUM (ЦУМ) luxury department store building.

It was during a meeting in then Sverdlov Square on 5 May 1920, that an iconic picture of Lenin was taken.

Notes

References 

 Moscow Encyclopaedia. Bolshaya Rossiiskaya Entsikolpediya, 1997. Article "Teatralnaya ploshchad".

Squares in Moscow
Tverskoy District